The 2015 Big 12 Conference women's soccer tournament was the postseason women's soccer tournament for the Big 12 Conference held from November 4 to 8, 2015. The seven-match tournament was held at the Swope Soccer Village in Kansas City, Missouri with a combined attendance of 2,812. The 8-team single-elimination tournament consisted of three rounds based on seeding from regular season conference play. The Texas Tech Red Raiders defeated the Kansas Jayhawks in the championship match to win their first conference tournament.

Regular season standings
Source:

Bracket

Awards

Most valuable player
Source:
Offensive MVP – Janine Beckie – Texas Tech
Defensive MVP – Lauren Watson – Texas Tech

All-Tournament team

References 
2015 Big 12 Soccer Championship

 
Big 12 Conference Women's Soccer Tournament